Edgars Kulda (born 13 November 1994) is a Latvian professional ice hockey winger currently playing for Dinamo Riga in the Kontinental Hockey League (KHL). He was selected 193th overall in the 2014 NHL Entry Draft by the Arizona Coyotes. He played in Latvian minor and youth leagues.

Playing career

Junior
Kulda began playing hockey in BHS hockey school and founded by former Dinamo Rīga player Helmuts Balderis.

In 2011–12 season Kulda moved to North America to play for Edmonton Oil Kings of WHL. His most successful season as Oil King was 2013–14, when Oil Kings won Memorial Cup and Kulda received Stafford Smythe Memorial Trophy as Memorial Cup Most Valuable Player.

Professional
In 2015–16 season Kulda moved back to Latvia and joined his hometown club Dinamo Riga of KHL. He made his KHL debut on 3 September 2015, in overtime loss against Medveščak Zagreb.

After a three year absence, highlighted with a lone season with PSG Berani Zlín of the Czech Extraliga, Kulda returned to Dinamo Riga on a one-year contract as a free agent on 7 August 2021.

International play
Kulda represented Latvia in junior and U18 championships. In 2016, he made his debut in 2016 World Championships in opening match overtime loss against Sweden.

Personal life
Edgars Kulda is the younger brother of Arturs Kulda.

Career statistics

Regular season and playoffs

International

References

External links

1994 births
Living people
Arizona Coyotes draft picks
Dinamo Riga players
Edmonton Oil Kings players
HK Riga players
HK Zemgale players
Latvian ice hockey left wingers
Metallurg Novokuznetsk players
PSG Berani Zlín players
Ice hockey people from Riga
Latvian expatriate sportspeople in the Czech Republic
Latvian expatriate sportspeople in Kazakhstan
Latvian expatriate sportspeople in Russia
Latvian expatriate sportspeople in Denmark
Latvian expatriate sportspeople in Canada
Latvian expatriate ice hockey people
Expatriate ice hockey players in the Czech Republic
Expatriate ice hockey players in Canada
Expatriate ice hockey players in Denmark
Expatriate ice hockey players in Russia
Expatriate ice hockey players in Kazakhstan